{{Speciesbox
| image = 
| image_caption = 
| display_parents = 2
| parent_authority = Amsel, 1954
| taxon = Arimania komaroffi
| authority = (Ragonot, 1888)
| synonyms = 
Salebria komaroffi Ragonot, 1888
Salebria komaroffi var. amanella Zerny in Osthelder, 1935
Nephopteryx diplocapna Meyrick, 1937
}}Arimania is a monotypic snout moth genus described by Hans Georg Amsel in 1954. Its only species, Arimania komaroffi, was described by Émile Louis Ragonot in 1888. It is found in Transcaucasia, Turkey, Iran and Iraq.

Adults are on wing from April to May and again from August to September in two generations per year.

The larvae feed on the pericarp and mesocarp of Pistacia vera''. They bore into the fruits. Pupation takes place in the soil. The species overwinters in the pupal stage.

References

Phycitinae
Monotypic moth genera
Moths of Asia